The Harley-Davidson Museum is an American museum located in Milwaukee, Wisconsin celebrating the more than 100-year history of Harley-Davidson motorcycles. The  three-building complex on  along the Menomonee River bank contains more than 450 Harley-Davidson motorcycles and hundreds of thousands of artifacts from the Harley-Davidson Motor Company's 118-year history.

History

The museum was built in an historically industrial area of Milwaukee. Prior to Harley-Davidson's purchase of the land from the city, the site was formerly used by the Milwaukee Department of Public Works, Lakeshore Sand Company, and Morton Salt. A  layer of imported soil was added to combat the contaminated soil. New vegetation was planted to restore the landscape to its riparian state.

In late February 2006, designs for the museum were unveiled. The designs were created by James Biber, a partner at Pentagram, his team, and Michael Zweck-Bonner, an associate at Pentagram. Abbott Miller, a partner at Pentagram, designed the museum's permanent exhibitions. The firm designed the museum over a period of eight years.

The site includes parking spaces for 1,000 motorcycles and 500 cars. The museum's façade also features a -tall, steel Harley-Davidson sign.

Exhibits

The museum's galleries permanent exhibitions, spread throughout two floors, in addition to temporary exhibits and the motor company's archives. The complex also includes a restaurant, café, retail shop, and special event spaces.

Also on display are historic Harley-Davidson items that tell the company's story and history, such as photographs, posters, advertisements, clothes, trophies, video footage of vintage and contemporary motorcycling, and interactive exhibits, including 10 motorcycles that visitors can sit on.

The Motorcycle Gallery
On the museum's upper level, a procession of motorcycles is displayed down the center of the main hall, running the length of the building, with galleries on either side.

The Harley-Davidson Journey
Along the east side of the upstairs galleries, a series of interconnected galleries exhibit the Harley-Davidson's chronological history. The galleries relate the company's history from its origins in a  wooden shack to its current status as the top U.S. motorcycle manufacturer, producing more than 330,000 bikes each year.
The centerpiece of the gallery is "Serial Number One", the oldest known Harley-Davidson in existence, which is encased in glass. The glass enclosure sits within a floor-embedded, illuminated outline of the backyard shed the motor company was founded in.

The Engine Room
The museum's second floor galleries begin with the Engine Room. A Knucklehead engine is displayed disassembled into several pieces. The Engine Room also features several interactive touch screen elements that show how Harley motors, including Panhead and Shovelhead motors work.

Clubs and Competition
The Clubs and Competition gallery includes displays and information about Harley-Davidson's racing history. The gallery includes a section of a replica wooden board track, suspended in the air at a 45-degree incline. Fatalities were common, which led to the banning of wooden board tracks for motorcycle racing.

Tank Gallery
The museum's upper floor exhibits also include the Gas Tank Gallery, formerly part of the Harley-Davidson 100th Anniversary Open Road Tour. The exhibit displays 100 of Harley-Davidson's most memorable tank graphics, spanning 70 years, selected by the company's styling department and reproduced on "Fat Bob" tanks.

Custom Culture
The Custom Culture gallery covers Harley-Davidson's impact on American and global culture. The centerpiece of the Custom Culture Gallery is "King Kong", a -long, two-engine Harley-Davidson motorcycle customized by Felix Predko. The exhibit also features exact replicas of the customized Harley-Davidson bikes ridden by Peter Fonda and Dennis Hopper in the 1969 American movie, "Easy Rider", including Fonda's "Captain America" chopper and Hopper's "Billy Bike". Two of each of the two choppers were created, and one "Captain America" was destroyed in the film's production.

Corporate Archives & Collections

The Harley-Davidson Motor Company's corporate archives are also housed on the museum's grounds. The archives supplied more than 85% of the items on display in the museum. Since 1915, the company's founders decided to pull one bike from the production line to be preserved in an archive.

See also
 The Hill Climber outdoor sculpture

References

External links

2008 establishments in Wisconsin
Buildings and structures in Milwaukee
Museum
Industry museums in Wisconsin
Motorcycle museums in the United States
Museums established in 2008
Museums in Milwaukee
Transportation museums in Wisconsin